Lucius Volcatius Tullus may refer to:
 Lucius Volcatius Tullus (consul 66 BC), Roman politician
 Lucius Volcatius Tullus (consul 33 BC), his son